The International Criminal Court Moot Court Competition or ICCMCC is an annual international moot court competition on international criminal law that is held at The Hague and organised by the Grotius Centre for International Legal Studies of Leiden University, The Hague Campus, with the institutional support of the International Criminal Court and International Bar Association. Pace Law School had conceived of the moot as an in-class exercise in 2004, and it was in 2005 that a domestic competition was started. The competition became international the following year, with the finals being held in 2007. With more than 100 teams from 50 countries taking part annually, the ICCMCC is the world's largest competition on international criminal law and is considered one of the grand slam or major moots.

Judges of the competition include ICC judges and officers, and teams have to present arguments based on a fictitious problem via the roles of prosecution counsel, defence counsel, government counsel, or victim's representative. The arguments made usually relate to pre-trial or appeal proceedings. Each team is given 20 minutes for the main submissions and 10 minutes for rebuttal/surebuttal. For the English edition of the moot, each country can only send two to three teams to participate; where necessary, regional rounds and national are organised to select the teams that will compete in the international rounds. To date, such rounds have been held for the Americas and Caribbean, Brazil, China, Georgia, Germany, India, Iran, Israel, and the Netherlands. For the international rounds, in 2013, semi-final rounds were introduced for the top nine teams, with the top three teams proceeding to the championship final. In 2015, the number of preliminary rounds were increased from three to six, and in 2016 quarter-final rounds were introduced for the top 27 teams. In 2020, the oral rounds were cancelled due to COVID-19, and in 2021 and 2022, the competition adopted an online format due to continuing travel restrictions.

Singapore Management University, which debuted in 2015, has the best track record in this competition, having reached the international championship final five times and winning it four times.

Competition records (English rounds)

References

Moot court competitions
International law